Intereconomics – Review of European Economic Policy is a bimonthly journal covering economic and social policy issues in Europe or affecting Europe. The editor-in-chief is Jun.-Prof. Dr. Christian Breuer and it is published by Springer Science+Business Media. It is an official publication of the German National Library of Economics (ZBW) and the Centre for European Policy Studies.

History  and profile
Intereconomics was established in 1966 at the Hamburg Institute of International Economics. In 2007, this institute was merged with the ZBW. In January 2009, the ZBW joined forces with the Centre for European Policy Studies, with the aim of making the magazine the leading forum for research-based discussions of major European economic policy issues.

The magazine, published by Springer Berlin Heidelberg, consists of the editorial, forum, and articles sections. The editorial section contains brief comments on current questions of economic policy. In the forum section, several authors voice their opinions on one particular current economic policy problem. The articles deal with economic policy issues and trends.

Advisory board 
 Eileen Appelbaum
 Brian Bayliss
 Ulrich Blum
 Ralf Boscheck
 László Csaba
 Sylvester C. W. Eijffinger
 Santiago García Echevarría
 Daniel Gros
 Carsten Hefeker
 Arne Heise
 Wim Kösters
 Phedon A. Nicolaides
 Jacques Pelkmans
 Ronald Schettkat
 Gunther Tichy

See also 
Wirtschaftsdienst

References

External links 
 

1966 establishments in West Germany
Bimonthly journals
German economics journals
English-language journals
Economic policy in Europe
Publications established in 1966
Springer Science+Business Media